Jesus and Me: The Collection is a compilation album consisting of songs from contemporary Christian albums No More Night, Show Me Your Way, The Boy in Me plus two new songs, "Sure as the Sun" and "Turn Up the Radio". In 2011, a deluxe edition was released which added two songs from the Wings of Victory album, "On the Wings of Victory" and "I Will Arise".

Track listing

Personnel
Glen Campbell - vocals, acoustic guitar, bagpipes
Tom Hemby - acoustic guitar, electric guitar
Brent Rowan - acoustic guitar
Craig Fall - acoustic guitar
T.J. Kuenster - keyboards
Phil Nash - keyboards
Geoff Thurman - keyboards, bass guitar, drums
Cliff Downs - keyboards, drums
Shane Keister - keyboards
Dave Huntsinger - keyboards
Dann Huff - electric guitar
Kim Darigan - bass guitar
Gary Lunn - bass guitar
David Hungate - bass guitar
Jackie Street - bass guitar
Steve Turner - drums
Paul Leim - drums
Farrell Morris - drums
Carl Marsh - Synthesizer
Strings - The A Strings/Nashville String Machine
Background vocals - Cliff Downs, Mike Eldred, Mara Gail Getz, Michael Mellett, Cheryl Rogers, Geoff Thurman, Bergen White, Wendy Suit Johnson, Lisa Silver, Woodmont Baptist Choir, J.J. Lee, Brenda Jewel, Howard Jewel, David Danner, Becky Naish, Lois Holland, Ken Hollard, Diane Tidwell, Peggy Auther, Karen Worthy

Production
Producers - Geoff Thurman, Ken Harding, Cliff Downs, Bergen White, Greg Nelson, Ronnie Brookshire, Glen Campbell
Art Direction - The Bottom Line Graphics, Nashville, TN
Production assistants - Debra Harding, Jan Perry
Mixing - Ronnie Brookshire, Bill Deaton
Mixed at Omni Sound Studio, Quad Studio, Sound Emporium, North Beach, Nashville, TN and Sound Interchange, Toronto, Ontario
Assistant engineers - Patrick Kelly, Todd Robbins
Overdubs - Ronnie Brookshire, Bill Deaton
Mastering by Hank Williams, Ken Love
Mastered at Master Mix, Nashville, Tennessee

1996 compilation albums
Glen Campbell compilation albums